Orini is a rural community in the Waikato District and Waikato region of New Zealand's North Island. It is located east of Taupiri

Orini is centred around a community hall which was opened in 1913, which was rebuilt in 1937 following a fire. It also has a school, which had 81 pupils in 1939.

A post office opened in 1907. A creamery was running in 1911. A cheese factory opened in 1915, and was still operating in 1932. The stream bridge between Orini and Whitikahu was built in 1938. By 1950 the Orini telephone exchange had 123 subscribers.

The Mangawara area to the west was a Kauri gum digging area until 1983. It also had a creamery and a post office by 1910.

Te Hoe, to the north, had a school between 1912 and 1995. It had a post office and store and still has a hall, which was built in 1957.

History

From the 1600s: Ngati Koura and Ngati Wairere Waikai occupied the area, mainly for eel fishing. An old waka was discovered in 1937.

After the invasion of the Waikato, the area was confiscated in 1863 and cut up into lots for the military settlers, though deemed too swampy for occupation.

Flax was milled in the area from 1890 until a 1908 fire and again from 1918. A new Orini mill opened in 1936 and flax was still being grown in 1938, when there was another fire. The drained peat has also caught fire from time to time.

Electricity came in 1928. A hall was built and a bus service to Hamilton, started in 1937 and was still running in 1964 and into the 1970s.

Education 

Orini had a school by 1912. It was replaced with Orini Combined School, formed from a merger of Orini, Te Hoe, Netherby and Mangawara schools.

References

External links 
 Mangawara Stream water level

Populated places in Waikato
Waikato District